This is a list of music artists and bands from Argentina, categorized according to musical genre.

Old Cumbia Villera
Damas Gratis

Tango
Mario Abramovich
Alfredo De Angelis
Carlos Acuña
Eduardo Arolas
Juan d'Arienzo
Rodolfo Biagi
Eladia Blázquez
Manuel Buzón
Enrique Cadícamo
Miguel Caló
Alberto Caracciolo
Julio de Caro
Cacho Castaña
Cátulo Castillo
Pascual Contursi
Ignacio Corsini
Enrique Mario Francini
Carlos Gardel
Roberto Goyeneche
Agustín Magaldi
Eduardo Makaroff
Juan Pablo Jofre
Raúl Kaplún
Francisco Lomuto
Alberto Morán
Mariano Mores
Marcelo Nisinman
Astor Piazzolla
Edmundo Rivero
Enrique Santos Discépolo
Carlos di Sarli
Héctor Varela (musician)

Cuarteto
La Mona Jiménez
Rodrigo

Chamamé
Chango Spasiuk

Other Argentine folk music
Jorge Cafrune
Eduardo Falú
Horacio Guarany
Ginamaría Hidalgo
El Chaqueño Palavecino
Ariel Ramírez
Atahualpa Yupanqui

Nueva canción, Nueva Trova/protest music
Facundo Cabral
César Isella

Bolero
Estela Raval

Argentine-Spaniard fusion
Los Rodríguez

Reggae
Fidel Nadal
Los Pericos

Ska
Los Fabulosos Cadillacs
La Mosca Tsé - Tsé

Rock
Rata Blanca
Andrés Calamaro
Fabiana Cantilo
Gustavo Cerati
Los Auténticos Decadentes
Ariel Nan
Charly García
Fito Páez
Soda Stereo
Luis Alberto Spinetta
Enanitos Verdes
Bersuit Vergarabat
Vicentico
Vilma Palma e Vampiros
Patricio Rey y sus Redonditos de Ricota

Hip hop
Illya Kuryaki and the Valderramas

Electropop
Miranda!
Entre Ríos (band)
Juana Molina

Pop
Lali Espósito
Bahiano
Alejandro Lerner
Miguel Mateos
Abel Pintos
Diego Torres

Ballad
Alberto Cortez

Instrumental
Gustavo Santaolalla

Piano
Bruno Gelber

Argentina
Argentina
Musicians
Artists and bands